Lamerd International Airport  is an international airport located in Lamerd, Iran that is the international airport of Fars Province and southern region of Iran.

Airlines and destinations

References

Airports in Iran
Buildings and structures in Fars Province
Transportation in Fars Province